Oluwatobiloba Ayomide "Tobi" Amusan   (born 23 April 1997) is a Nigerian track and field athlete who specialises in the 100 metres hurdles and also competes as a sprinter. She is the current World, Commonwealth and African champion in the 100 m hurdles, as well as the meet record holder in those three competitions. Amusan became the first ever Nigerian world champion and world record holder in an athletics event when she won the 2022 World Championships 100 m hurdles gold medal, setting the current world record of 12.12 seconds in the semi-final, followed up by a wind-assisted 12.06 s in the final. She won back-to-back Commonwealth and African titles in 2018 and 2022 in the 100 m hurdles and is also a two-time African Games champion in the event.

In 2015, Amusan took gold in the 100 m hurdles at the African Junior Championships and the same year, as an 18-year-old, secured her first title at the African Games. In 2021, Amusan became the first Nigerian athlete to win a Diamond League title as she took the 100 m hurdles trophy, breaking the then-African record held by Glory Alozie in the process. She retained her title in 2022.

Early life and education
Tobi Amusan was born on April 23, 1997, in Ijebu Ode, Ogun State, Nigeria, to Mr and Mrs Amusan, who are school teachers. Tobi, as she is fondly called, is the last child of three siblings. She had her Secondary School Education at Our Lady of Apostles Secondary School, Ijebu Ode.

Career
From an early age, Amusan was an accomplished athlete. She was the 200 metres silver medallist at the 2013 African Youth Championships held in Warri. A year later, she took her first major medal in the 100 metres hurdles, which was also silver, at the African Youth Games. She then claimed gold in the event at the 2015 African Junior Athletics Championships in Addis Ababa. Also in 2015, while making her All-Africa Games debut as an eighteen-year-old, she won the gold medal in the 100 m hurdles.

2016
In 2016, as a freshman for the University of Texas at El Paso (UTEP), Amusan became the second athlete for the university to be named C-USA Female Track Athlete of the Year since UTEP joined C-USA. She was the gold medallist in both the 100 m hurdles and the 200 m. She also claimed a silver in the long jump at the C-USA Championships. Amusan first broke the 13 s barrier in the hurdles with a time of 12.83 s at the El Paso UTEP Invitational. This eclipsed Kim Turner's UTEP record, which had stood for 33 years. She was runner-up at the 2016 NCAA Outdoor Championships in the 100 m hurdles. She ran a windy 12.79 s behind Kentucky's Jasmine Camacho-Quinn. Amusan also competed at the 2016 World Junior Championships in Bydgoszcz, Poland. Despite running her second-fastest time ever, she placed fifth in the final. She went on to represent Nigeria at the Rio Olympic Games, reaching the semifinals of the 100 m hurdles.

2017
In her first outdoor race of 2017, she ran a then-lifetime best and UTEP record of 12.63 s in the 100 m hurdles. She was the C-USA champion in her specialist event and also the runner up in the 200 m. At the 2017 NCAA Outdoor Championships, there was a reversal of finishes in the 100 m hurdles. In a dramatic race, Amusan claimed the title ahead of Camacho-Quinn, who was the previous year's champion. She did this in a personal record time of 12.57 s. She also represented Nigeria at the World Championships in London later in the year.

2018: Commonwealth and African champion
Amusan ran a personal best of 7.89 s in the 60 m hurdles at the start of her 2018 season. She represented her country at the Birmingham World Indoor Championships, reaching the final in the event.

At the 2018 Commonwealth Games in Gold Coast, Australia, 2015 world champion Danielle Williams seemed to be the favourite to take the title in the absence of Sally Pearson. In the final, however, Amusan moved ahead of her competitors and won the race by a clear metre ahead of Williams. She also won a bronze medal in the 4 × 100 m relay with her teammates, Joy Udo-Gabriel, Blessing Okagbare and Rosemary Chukwuma. Later in the year, she won her first African Championship title in her signature event at the Asaba African Championships. This fulfilled a Nigerian tradition being 11th gold for Nigeria in the 100 m hurdles since Judy Bell-Gam triumphed at the inaugural edition of the championships in 1979. She also claimed a gold medal in the 4 × 100 m relay at the championships.

2019: Second African Games title
In August, the 22-year-old successfully defended her African Games title. On 5 October at the World Championships in Doha, Qatar, she ran a personal best of 12.48 s during the 100 m hurdles qualifying rounds. In the semi-finals the following day, she equaled this personal best before placing fourth a few hours later in the final with a time of 12.49 s.

2021: First Nigerian Diamond League champion
Amusan finished fourth at the delayed 2020 Tokyo Olympics with a time of 12.60 s. She later competed in the Zürich Diamond League final event, which she won in a new African record of 12.42 s, breaking 23-years-old best of 12.44 s held by her compatriot Glory Alozie and becoming the first Nigerian to win a Diamond League trophy.

2022: World, Commonwealth, African and Diamond League champion

In June, Amusan defended her 100 m hurdles title at the African Championships in Mauritius with a time of 12.57 s. She also competed in the women's 4 × 100 m relay to earn a second gold medal. The same month, she lowered her African record in her specialist event with a 12.41 s clocking when winning at the Diamond League meet in Paris.

The 25-year-old entered the World Championships held in Eugene, Oregon in July as a medal contender after back-to-back fourth-place finishes. In the heats, she again bettered her African record with a time of 12.40 s, improving by a further 0.01 s. In the semi-final, Amusan set a new world record of 12.12 seconds, breaking the previous best of 12.20 s set by American Kendra Harrison in 2016 and becoming the first Nigeria's world record holder in an athletics event. It was the largest improvement for a world record in the 100 m hurdles in 42 years. She bested her time once again in the final, running 12.06 s (2.5 m/s wind assisted, thus not a legal WR), becoming the first Nigeria's world champion at the World Athletics Championships.

In August at the Commonwealth Games in Birmingham, Amusan successfully defended her title, winning her second consecutive gold medal in the 100 m hurdles with a new Games record of 12.30 s. She also helped power Nigeria's women's 4 × 100 m relay team to gold. She competed in her specialist event at the Lausanne Diamond Race meet later that month, finishing second with a time of 12.60 s, behind reigning Olympic champion Jasmine Camacho-Quinn. Amusan wrapped up her long and successful 2022 campaign by winning 100 m hurdles at the Zürich Diamond League final event with a 12.29 s performance to retain her title. She finished ahead of, 2–4, Tia Jones, Britany Anderson, and Camacho-Quinn, setting a new meet record in the process.

Personal life
She's close friends with fellow Nigerian athlete Ese Brume

Achievements

International competitions

Circuit win and titles
 Diamond League champion 100 m hurdles:  2021,  2022
 100 m hurdles wins, other events specified in parenthesis
 2021: Zürich Weltklasse
 2021: Paris Meeting (AR), Zürich

National and NCAA titles
 Nigerian Championships
 100 m hurdles: 2021, 2022
 4 × 100 m relay: 2022
 NCAA Division I Women's Outdoor Track and Field Championships
 100 m hurdles: 2017

Personal bests

Awards and honours
2022
 Confederation of African Athletics Female Athlete of the Year

See also
List of African Games medalists in athletics (women)
List of Commonwealth Games medallists in athletics (women)

References

External links

 
 
 
 
 
 Oluwatobiloba Amusan at All-Athletics

1997 births
Living people
People from Ijebu Ode
Nigerian female sprinters
Nigerian female hurdlers
Olympic female hurdlers
Olympic athletes of Nigeria
Athletes (track and field) at the 2016 Summer Olympics
African Games gold medalists for Nigeria
African Games medalists in athletics (track and field)
Athletes (track and field) at the 2015 African Games
Athletes (track and field) at the 2019 African Games
Commonwealth Games gold medallists for Nigeria
Commonwealth Games bronze medallists for Nigeria
Commonwealth Games medallists in athletics
Athletes (track and field) at the 2018 Commonwealth Games
Athletes (track and field) at the 2014 Summer Youth Olympics
Yoruba sportswomen
Sportspeople from Ogun State
African Championships in Athletics winners
Commonwealth Games gold medallists in athletics
African Games gold medalists in athletics (track and field)
Athletes (track and field) at the 2020 Summer Olympics
Diamond League winners
World Athletics record holders
Medallists at the 2018 Commonwealth Games
Medallists at the 2022 Commonwealth Games